Alfred Rahlfs' edition of the Septuagint, sometimes called Rahlfs' Septuagint or Rahlfs' Septuaginta, is a critical edition of the Septuagint published for the first time in 1935 by the German philologist Alfred Rahlfs. This edition is the most widely spread edition of the Septuagint.

The full title of this edition is: Septuaginta: id est Vetus Testamentum Graece iuxta LXX interpretes; this edition was first published in 1935, in 2 volumes, by the Deutsche Bibelgesellschaft, in Stuttgart. Many reprints were made later.

The name of the 2006 revision is known as the Rahlfs-Hanhart, after the revisor Robert Hanhart.

Main codices used 
In his edition, Rahlfs used mainly three codices to establish the text: Vaticanus, Sinaiticus and Alexandrinus, with the Vaticanus as the "leading manusript".

Revision 
In 2006 Robert Hanhart edited a revised version of the text, known as the "Editio altera", or "Rahlfs-Hanhart". The text of this revised edition contains only changes in the diacritics and two wording changes in Isaiah 5:17 and 53:2 (Is 5:17 ἀπειλημμένων became ἀπηλειμμένων, and Is 53:2 ἀνηγγείλαμεν became by conjecture ἀνέτειλε μένὰ).

See also 

 Roman Septuagint

References

Further reading

External links 

1935 edition on Wikisource
Revised edition online

Editions of the Septuagint
1935 non-fiction books